Maxwell Van Zandt Woodhull (September 17, 1843 – July 15, 1921) was a Union Army officer during the American Civil War.

Woodhull was born in Washington, D.C. on September 17, 1843. He was a graduate of Miami University (Ohio) and Columbian Law School. He was a lawyer before and after the Civil War.

Woodhull enlisted as a private on December 22, 1862. He was appointed captain and aide-de-camp to Major General Robert C. Schenck on March 11, 1863. He was appointed aide-de-camp to Major General Lew Wallace on March 12, 1864. He was appointed major and Assistant Adjutant General on June 30, 1864. He was appointed lieutenant colonel and Assistant Adjutant General of the XV Corps (Union Army), Army of the Tennessee, from February 17, 1865, to August 1, 1865. He later was appointed brevet colonel of volunteers, to rank from March 13, 1865.

On February 22, 1866, President Andrew Johnson nominated Woodhull for appointment to the grade of brevet brigadier general of volunteers, to rank from March 13, 1865, and the United States Senate confirmed the appointment on April 10, 1866. Woodhulll was mustered out of the volunteers on May 31, 1866.

Woodhull wrote West Point in Our Next War: The Only Way to Create and Maintain an Army (1915). Woodull was largely responsible for bringing George Washington University to its present location.

Maxwell Van Zandt Woodhull died July 26, 1921, at Watkins Glen, New York. He is buried at Oak Hill Cemetery (Washington, D.C.).

References

External links

List of American Civil War brevet generals (Union)

Union Army generals
1843 births
1921 deaths
Woodhull family
Burials at Oak Hill Cemetery (Washington, D.C.)